Association Media & Publishing (formerly SNAP) serves the needs of association publishers, communications professionals and the media they create. From blogs to magazines to wikis, Association Media & Publishing:

•Leads innovative approaches in community building, as shown by our use of social media, webinars and in-person learning opportunities;

•Hosts the recognition of industry and individual best practices via Excel Awards and publications review program; and,

•Provides career advancement via an online career center, networking opportunities and lifelong learning experiences.

Association Media & Publishing was known as the Society of National Association Publications (SNAP). Kathleen Rakestraw, outgoing president of SNAP, announced on June 4 that over the next year, the association will change its name to Association Media and Publishing. The name change was approved by the board of directors in May 2009, after a nearly two-year process of evaluation, survey and discussion. Association Media and Publishing believes the new name will:

•Focus on emerging markets, both geographically and discipline based;

•Focus on professionals who connect with association members both in and outside of print publications; and,

•Retain and honor our essential connection to publishing, which we view as both an art 	and a trade.

Mission Statement: 
To enhance the effectiveness of print and electronic publications professionals to meet their association’s communication and business goals.

External links 
  Society of National Association Publications (SNAP) Official Website

Trade associations based in the United States